Primelephas is a genus of Elephantinae that existed during the Miocene and Pliocene epochs.  The name of the genus suggests 'first elephant'.   These primitive elephantids are thought to be the common ancestor of Mammuthus, the mammoths, and the closely allied genera Elephas and Loxodonta, the Asian and African elephants, diverging some 4-6 million years ago. It had four tusks, which is a trait not shared with its descendants, but common in earlier proboscideans.  The type species, Primelephas gomphotheroides, was described by Vincent Maglio in 1970, with the specific epithet indicating the fossil specimens were gomphothere-like. Primelephas korotorensis is the only other species to be assigned to the genus.

References

Elephantidae
Pliocene proboscideans
Miocene proboscideans
Prehistoric elephants
Prehistoric placental genera
Neogene mammals of Africa
Fossil taxa described in 1970